Vytautas Barkauskas (25 March 1931 – 25 April 2020) was a Lithuanian composer and Professor of Composition of the Lithuanian Academy of Music and Theatre.

Life and career 
Barkauskas was born in Kaunas. He studied music at the Vilnius Conservatory with Antanas Račiūnas, a pupil of Nadia Boulanger. He also studied mathematics at the university's pedagogical institution. He achieved a degree in mathematics in 1953 and in composition in 1959. He taught at the conservatory from 1961 to 1974, again as a professor of composition from 1989.

Barkauskas was one of the most active avant-garde composers in Lithuania in the 1960s, influenced by Krzysztof Penderecki, Witold Lutosławski and György Ligeti. He moved later towards more intuitively arranged sounds, and writing more chamber music. "I do not restrict myself to any single, defined compositional system, but am constantly searching for a natural stylistic synthesis. I strive to make my music expressive, emotional and of a concerto type", he said.

His works have been performed at international festivals, competitions and concerts in various European, American and Asian countries, and have been interpreted by Yuri Bashmet, Juozas Domarkas, Lothar Faber, David Geringas, Joachim Greiner, Gidon Kremer, Ruth Palmer and others.

In 2000, his composition Journey of the Princess. Fairy Tale, Op. 114, was awarded the prize of the composers' competition dedicated to on the occasion of the 125th anniversary of birth of Mikalojus Konstantinas Čiurlionis. Barkauskas was awarded the Lithuanian State Prize in 2003. His symphonic work At the End is the Beginning, Op. 115, was awarded the prize at the Sinfonia Baltica International Composers' Competition in 2001. In 2003, the composer was awarded the Lithuanian National Prize for Culture and Arts. In 2005, he received the prize for the best chamber work, for Echoes for percussion solo, from the composers' competition organized by the Lithuanian Composers' Union.

Barkauskas died on 25 April 2020.

Work 
Barkauskas composed operas, symphonies, a viola concerto and a concerto for piano and strings, and chamber music, among others. Many of his compositions were published by Sikorski. Some works, such as Drei Fragmente für Violoncello und Bratsche, were published by the Friedrich Hofmeister Musikverlag.

References

External links 
 
 
 

1931 births
2020 deaths
Lithuanian composers
Music educators
Recipients of the Lithuanian National Prize
Lithuanian film score composers
Male film score composers
Musicians from Kaunas
20th-century composers
20th-century Lithuanian male musicians
21st-century composers
21st-century Lithuanian male musicians